Dicranoncus is a genus of beetles in the family Carabidae, containing the following species:

 Dicranoncus femoralis Chaudoir, 1850
 Dicranoncus philippinensis Jedlicka, 1935
 Dicranoncus pocillator Bates, 1892
 Dicranoncus queenslandicus (Sloane, 1903)

References

Platyninae